Salahuddin Yusuf (died 2000) was a Bangladesh Awami League politician and the former Member of Parliament of Khulna-5.

Career
Yusuf was elected to parliament from Khulna-5 as a Bangladesh Awami League candidate in 1991 and 1996. He served as the Minister of Health & Family Welfare in the First Sheikh Hasina Cabinet.

References

2000 deaths
Awami League politicians
5th Jatiya Sangsad members
7th Jatiya Sangsad members
Health and Family Welfare ministers of Bangladesh
1st Jatiya Sangsad members
2nd Jatiya Sangsad members
Bangladesh Krishak Sramik Awami League central committee members